Mile is a masculine given name found in Croatia, Bosnia, Serbia, Montenegro, North Macedonia and Bulgaria. It is often found as a contraction of Milan or Miodrag.

It may refer to:

 Mile Akmadžić (born 1939), Bosnian Croat politician
 Mile Bogović (1939–2020), Croatian Catholic bishop
 Mile Budak (1889–1945), Croatian fascist politician and writer
 Mile Dedaković (born 1951), Croatian soldier
 Mile Ilić (born 1984), Serbian basketball player
 Mile Isakov (born 1950), Serbian journalist and politician
 Mile Isaković (born 1958), Serbian handball player and coach
 Mile Janakieski, Republic of Macedonia politician
 Mile Jedinak (born 1984), Australian soccer player of Croatian descent
 Mile Kitić (born 1952), Bosnian-born Serbian singer
 Mile Klopčič (1905–1984), Slovenian poet
 Mile Knežević (born 1971), Serbian football player
 Mile Kos (1925–2014), Serbian football player, coach and sportswriter
 Mile Krajina (c. 1923–2014), Croatian gusle player
 Mile Krstev (born 1979), Macedonian football player
 Mile Lojpur (1930–2005), Serbian rock musician
 Mile Markovski (1939–1975), Bulgarian and Macedonian writer
 Mile Martić (born 1954), Croatian Serb politician
 Mile Matić (1956–1994), Yugoslav spree killer
 Mile Mećava (1915–1942), Bosnian Serb partisan
 Mile Mijušković (born 1985), Montenegrin handball player
 Mile Milovac (born 1965), Serbian American soccer player
 Mile Mrkšić (1947–2015), Serbian soldier
 Mile Nakić (born 1942), Croatian water polo player and coach
 Mile Nedelkoski (1935–2020), Macedonian poet
 Mile Novaković (1950–2015), Croatian Serb general
 Mile Novković (born 1950), Serbian footballer
 Mile Pajic (born 1955), Dutch motorcycle racer
 Mile V. Pajić (born 1958), Serbian visual artist
 Mile Perković (1920–2013), Yugoslav Partisan and sports administrator
 Mile Pešorda, Bosnian Croat writer
 Mile Petković (born 1953), Croatian football manager
 Mile Petrović, Croatian rower
 Mile Protić (born 1950), Serbian basketball coach
 Mile Popyordanov (1877–1901), Bulgarian Macedonian revolutionary
 Mile Savković (born 1992), Serbian football player
 Mile Smodlaka (born 1976), Croatian water polo player and coach
 Mile Starčević (1862–1917), Croatian politician
 Mile Starčević (1904–1953), Croatian politician
 Mile Sterjovski (born 1979), Australian football player
 Mile Stojkoski (born 1965), Macedonian parathlete
 Mile Svilar (born 1999), Belgian footballer of Serbian descent
 Mile Škorić (born 1991), Croatian football player
 Mile Uzelac (born 1978), Croatian handball player
 Mile Zechevikj, Macedonian politician

See also
 Mila (given name)

Croatian masculine given names
Serbian masculine given names
Macedonian masculine given names